Pârâul Vacii may refer to:

 Pârâul Vacii (Curpătu)

See also 
 Văcăria River (disambiguation)